The Monkey Kid is a 1995 Chinese-American drama film directed by Wang Xiao-yen. The film concerns a child living through the Cultural Revolution. It was screened in the Un Certain Regard section at the 1995 Cannes Film Festival.

Cast
Fu Di as Shi-Wei
Shu Fang as Mother
Yang Guang as Xiao-Hua
Lin Yang as Professor
Chang Hung-mei as Xiao-Qing
Yang Wang as Li-Li

Filming
Prior to filming, Wang Xiao-yen proposed a script to the Chinese Censure Bureau. Following a review, the bureau instructed the director to remove a Mao quotation and inserting one of his poems. Despite doing so, Wang Xiao-yen failed to obtain official permission, resulting into a film that was made illegally. While in the early stages of production, Wang Xiao-yen and her husband hired children from an acting studio by contacting their parents outside the school. Prior to the film being smuggled by Xiao-yen and her family into the United States, she managed to edit it in China.

Reception
Christopher Smith of the Bangor Daily News said that The Monkey Kid is a "must-see" film.

In a review for Variety magazine, Derek Elley wrote: "A neat idea gets a vigorous but incomplete workout in The Monkey Kid, a loose portrait of an ankle-biter's everyday life during the depths of the Cultural Revolution that has charm to spare. Though this feather-light indie production by California-based Xiao-yen Wang, based on her own childhood in Peking, has some darker resonances for those willing to dig for them, pic represents a marketing challenge beyond cable and other broadcast outings".

According to Julian Guthrie of the San Francisco Chronicle "The Monkey Kid is an unforgettable tale of a bright, enchanting young girl who grows up during the harsh era of Mao Zedong's Cultural Revolution".

Jay Carr of The Boston Globe praised the lead role by Fu Di, writing that "Fu Di devises ways of sliding out from under the death grip of the Revolution that will make you want to cheer".

Hubert Niogret said that the film is "[a] moving and sentimental chronicle of a distant childhood, The Monkey Kid is a short narration, produced with modest means, taking into account the difficulties that there are, today in China, to shoot a film in real settings on a time that we prefer to forget. Because the children are well photographed there, without tenderness or condescension, the film dispenses a certain charm, but the lightness of the historical analysis (wanted or obliged?)"

References

Bibliography

External links

1995 drama films
Films about Chinese Americans
Chinese drama films
American drama films
Chinese-language American films
1990s American films